Paul Gordon Clark (born 29 April 1957) is a British Labour Party politician who was the Member of Parliament (MP) for Gillingham from 1997 to 2010. During his time in government, Paul Clark served as Parliamentary Private Secretary to Derry Irvine, Charles Falconer, John Prescott, and Ed Balls, before being promoted in 2008 to the role of Parliamentary Under Secretary of State at the Department for Transport. At the 2010 general election Clark was defeated by the Conservative Party candidate Rehman Chishti in the newly formed constituency of Gillingham and Rainham.

In 2022, Paul Clark pleaded guilty to possessing and distributing indecent images of children.

Education
Clark was educated at Featherby Infants and Junior Schools and Gillingham Grammar School. He went on to gain a BA in economics and politics at Keele University in 1980. At university he became a sabbatical officer as Student Union Secretary. Later he studied for a diploma in management studies at the University of Derby in 1997. In 2011 Paul Clark was awarded an honorary doctorate by the University of Greenwich.

Career
Paul Clark first became MP for Gillingham in the Labour landslide in the 1997 general election where he overturned a Conservative majority of 16,638. He had two further successful campaigns for Parliament in 2001 and 2005. Before becoming MP for Gillingham he had been on Gillingham Borough Council from 1982 until 1990 as a Labour councillor. From 1983 until 1989 he was deputy leader of the local party, and was elected leader in 1989. In 1990 he was elected by the Gillingham Labour Party to stand as the parliamentary candidate. His career prior to becoming an MP was with the AEEU and then the TUC.

After being elected in 1997 Paul Clark was PPS to Lord Irvine of Lairg, the Lord Chancellor, then PPS to Lord Falconer of Thoroton in the Department for Transport and later the Home Office. Clark was finally promoted to the Whips' office between 2003 and 2005. After the 2005 election he became PPS to deputy prime minister John Prescott until 2007, then PPS to Ed Balls in the Department for Children, Schools and Families. In October 2008 he was promoted to Parliamentary Under Secretary of State for the Department of Transport, where his responsibilities included international networks, road safety and motoring and freight services agencies.

Since leaving Parliament Paul Clark has established Gateway Associates, a company which draws on the skills and experience of policy, government and communications experts to help organisations from a variety of industries and sectors communicate with Westminster and Whitehall and inform Central Government's decision making processes.

In 2013 Paul Clark was selected by Gillingham and Rainham Labour Party as PPC for the 2015 general election.

In 2017, Clark released a statement stating that he would not be running in the 2017 general election.

Notes

References

External links
  Gateway associates website
 
 ePolitix - Paul Clark official site
 Guardian Unlimited Politics - Ask Aristotle: Paul Clark MP
 TheyWorkForYou.com - Paul Clark MP
 BBC Politics page

1957 births
Living people
Labour Party (UK) MPs for English constituencies
UK MPs 1997–2001
UK MPs 2001–2005
UK MPs 2005–2010
Alumni of Keele University
Alumni of the University of Derby
People from Gillingham, Kent
Councillors in Kent
People educated at Gillingham Grammar School, Kent